Alana Toktarova (born 23 April 2003) is a Kazakh figure skater. She is a two-time Kazakhstani national champion (2017, 2018). At the 2018 World Junior Championships, she qualified to the final segment and finished 22nd overall.

On the junior level, she is the 2018 Olympic Hopes champion, the 2018 FBMA Trophy silver medalist, the 2018 Golden Spin of Zagreb bronze medalist, and a three-time Kazakhstani junior national champion (2014-2016).

Programs

Results
JGP: ISU Junior Grand Prix

References

External links 
 

2003 births
Living people
Kazakhstani female single skaters
People from Taldykorgan